The Boardman is a series of rowhouses at 39-53 Montana Street, occupying an entire city block between Hoosac and Blackinton Streets in North Adams, Massachusetts.  The building was, at the time of its construction (1899–1901), one of the most elaborate multiunit buildings in the city, and were added to the National Register of Historic Places in 1985.

Description and history

The Boardman is located southeast of downtown North Adams, on the west side of Montana Street, occupying the full block between Blackinton Street and Hoosac Street.  It is a 2-1/2 story rowhouse consisting of nine units, set townhouse style in a single structure.  The first floor was built of stone, while the second floor is of wood frame construction originally covered in wooden clapboards.  Each unit featured porches in front and in back, and has what was originally considered a servant staircase in the rear, an indication of the status of the intended  occupants.  The servants' quarters were located in the attic level.  The typical unit has a two-part facade, with a porch on one side and a bay window adjacent.  The porches are shed-roofed, with a rounded arch housing the entrance and a flanking sash window.  The porches are supported by clustered round columns, set on raised brick piers, with a brick connecting parapet in between.

The Boardman was built by developer Walter Penniman in two stages on land subdivided from the estate of F. R. Blackinton in response to the demand for housing occasioned by the establishment of the normal school (now the Massachusetts College of Liberal Arts, located across the street).  The first four units were built in 1899, the other five in 1901.  The architect was Edwin Thayer Barlow, who designed the row in Colonial Revival style.  The Pennimans were briefly resident here, and its early tenants included teachers, a chemist, and the principal editor of the North Adams Transcript.

See also

 National Register of Historic Places listings in Berkshire County, Massachusetts

References

Notes

External links

Residential buildings on the National Register of Historic Places in Massachusetts
Buildings and structures in North Adams, Massachusetts
Residential buildings completed in 1901
National Register of Historic Places in Berkshire County, Massachusetts